She-Devils on Wheels is a 1968 American exploitation biker film about an all-female motorcycle gang called The Man-Eaters, directed and produced by Herschell Gordon Lewis. Actual female motorcycle club members were cast for the film, who were from the Iron Cross motorcycle club's Cut-Throats Division.

Plot

The film opens with Karen (Christie Wagner), a young woman leaving her mother's house after a visit. She drives her car to a local garage where she trades it with a motorcycle and changes out of her sun dress into street clothes (blue jeans, a T-shirt, and a green fabric vest with an image of a pink cat head and the words "MAN-EATERS" on the back). Karen re-joins her real friends that she has apparently kept secret from her mother; Karen is a member of an all-female motorcycle gang called the Maneaters. The Maneaters hang out in an abandoned house and hold weekly motorcycle races at an abandoned airport runway. The leader of the Maneaters, the tough-minded Queen (Betty Connell), holds the races and the winner of each race gets first pick from the "stud line".

The race begins and Karen is the winner, with Queen coming in second. Nevertheless, Queen is a good sport and allows Karen to pick first. On this particular day, Queen and the rest of the Maneaters return to their hideout where a group of young men have also arrived, whom are male groupies to the all-women gang. Karen picks out her usual "stud", a friendly guy named Bill... the same one she has picked for four weeks in a row. However, this is strictly forbidden among the Maneaters for according to their code, no Maneater is allowed to be attached to anyone or anything but the gang. One of the fastest held rules of the group is that "all men are mothers" and no Maneater falls in love.

Honey Pot, a teenage "mascot" and follower of the Maneaters who wants to join, reports to Queen her suspicions about Karen's attraction to Bill. After debating about it with her fellow members, Queen tells Honey Pot to inform Karen that she is to come to the runway that evening. When Karen shows up as expected, Queen and the rest of the gang angrily decrees to her a punishing ultimatum, Karen is to participate in the beating then dragging of Bill or face expulsion from the gang. Karen gets on her motorcycle and is forced to drag Bill, who is tied, beaten, and bruised behind her down the entire stretch of the runway and back. Bill is dead after this, and Karen's allegiance and loyalty to the gang is proven.

Another evening later, Honey Pot is finally granted membership into the gang. In a hazing ritual, Honey Pot has her left hand cut open in a blood oath and made to kiss all the members of the gang to prove her sisterhood. Next, Honey Pot is stripped to her underwear and doused in honey and chocolate syrup and made to entertain the entire "stud line". Following this, Honey Pot is cleaned off, is given a leather jacket with the Maneaters logo stamped on the back like the rest of the members and is formally initiated into the gang.

The next day, the gang rides into the small Florida town of Medley and terrorizes and harasses the locals by riding their motorcycles through parking lots, through storefronts, and around the front and back lawns of houses. When their antics are stopped by the local police, the townspeople (out of fear of retaliation) refuse to press charges. As a result, the police make no successful arrests. Unable to pin anything on the Maneaters, the police are forced to let them go, only giving Queen and the rest of the Maneaters a warning to stay out of trouble.

Another week later, the stud line competition is again on, and Queen and the rest of the Maneaters head off to the runway for another motorcycle race only to discover that an all-male gang are hanging out along the runway. What was supposed to be a fun-spirited race turns into an all-out brawl. Queen and the leader of the male gang, named Joe Boy (John Weymer), fight each other with knives, which leads to a full fight between the sex-crazed nymphs and their macho rivals which ends with the Maneaters being victorious.

Ted (Rodney Bedell), an old boyfriend of Karen's, manages to track her down and privately beseeches her to leave the Maneaters and return to normal life, either with or without him. Karen waivers, pleading the she is in too deep with the gang for any redemption and that he should forget about her. Refusing to give up on Karen, Ted infiltrates the "stud line" posing as one of the ruffians. After the race, where Queen emerges victorious, she gets first pick, but chooses another guy... unaware about Ted's identity, which Karen recognizes. Karen picks Ted and they go to chat in a nearby bedroom while an full-on orgy between the Maneaters and their guy followers happens in the main living room. Ted informs Karen that he heard through the grapevine that Joe Boy and his gang are out for blood after their humiliating beating by the Maneaters.

Among all this, Honey Pot steps outside the building for some fresh air and is waylaid by the spineless male gang. The next morning, the male gang returns Honey Pot back to the Maneaters hideout and flee. All of the ladies, including Queen, are horrified by Honey Pot's appearance of her bruised face which is covered in blood, as well as a large ring literally nailed through her nose. Also with the near-dead Honey Pot is a note from Joe Boy threatening the Maneaters with further retribution should they start another brawl with them.

After dropping off Honey Pot at a local hospital, Queen and the rest of the Maneaters head out in search of Honey Pot's assailants, including Joe Boy. The vigilante girls first head to a bar where Joe Boy is said to hang out at. The bartender refuses to disclose any information about Joe Boy's whereabouts and he gets severely beaten by the angry gang leader. Queen customizes the bartender's face with her trademark bike chain belt.

Two of the Maneaters, Whitey and Terry, spot Joe Boy and some of his gang at a local restaurant and report back to Queen, who arranges an ambush. Whitey and Terry return to the restaurant where they slash Joe Boy's tires of his car. When Joe Boy confronts them, Whitey sprays bug spray into Joe Boy's face and she and Terry take off on one motorcycle. Joe Boy takes Terry's motorcycle and gives chase.

However, this is all part of Queen's plan as she, always on top of the situation, had told Whitey and Terry to initiate a confrontation that will engage Joe Boy in a pursuit. As planned, Joe Boy follows Whitey and Terry along a road where Queen, Karen, Supergirl, Ginger, Delta, and the rest of the Maneaters lay in wait. Queen and the gang string along the road a nearly invisible wire. Whitey and Terry stop short, but Joe Boy unwittingly forges ahead and is literally decapitated by the wire, and his severed head goes flying. Exalted, Queen drops her trademark belt beside Joe Boy's headless corpse.

Afterwards, Ted approaches Karen one final time to persuade her to abandon the gang. Predictably, Karen again refuses and rides off with Queen and the rest of the Maneaters as they pack up from their hideout and ride out of town, leaving Ted alone and bewildered. Before riding out of Medley for any other town to hide out in and terrorize, Queen and the gang return to the scene of the crime to retrieve her chain belt that she left by Joe Boy's corpse only to find the town's entire police force there waiting for them. Threatened at gunpoint, Queen and all of the Maneaters are arrested for Joe Boy's murder.

In one of the first known examples of a post-credits scene, it is revealed that with only circumstantial evidence and nothing concrete forces the police to release the Maneaters leader. Queen rejoins her gang waiting for her outside the town's jail and they all ride out of town for places unknown.

Critical reception
In his review of the film, critic Jeffrey Kauffman wrote that "[f]or jaded modern day viewers, a lot of the depictions are going to seem quaint at best and pretty comedic at worst," adding that "a couple of immolations [...] securely link the film to some of Lewis' other splatter-fests." Writing in Eye for Film, critic Jennie Kermode wrote that although "the bikers themselves are authentic [...] [w]hat they can't do is act," and that the film "may lack the leather and lesbianism usually associated with the subgenre but She-Devils On Wheels has no shortage of camp."

See also
 List of American films of 1968
 Outlaw biker film
 List of biker films

References

External links
 
 

1968 films
1960s crime thriller films
1960s exploitation films
American independent films
Outlaw biker films
Films directed by Herschell Gordon Lewis
1960s gang films
1968 independent films
1960s English-language films
1960s American films